Oman has competed in 8 Summer Olympic Games. They have never competed in the Winter Olympic Games.  No Omani athlete has won an Olympic medal.

The Oman Olympic Committee was formed and recognized in 1982.

Medal tables

Medals by Summer Games

See also

 List of flag bearers for Oman at the Olympics
 Oman at the Paralympics
 Sport in Oman

External links
 
 
 

 
Olympics